Gaudencio Sillona III (born February 1, 1981), known professionally as Jay R, is a Filipino-American singer, songwriter, record producer, actor and model. In 2003, he released his debut album, Gameface, under Universal Records. The album was certified platinum by the Philippine Association of the Record Industry (PARI), receiving numerous awards and earning him the number one single, "Bakit Pa Ba".

Jay R was dubbed as "R&B Prince" in his early career and was often partnered with Kyla (then known as the "R&B Princess"). Collectively known to their fans as "JayLa", they are known in the music industry as the R&B Royalties (R&B King and Queen, respectively). In 2006, he built a recording studio inside his mansion, followed by a recording label called JAYRS Music. He later renamed it as Homeworkz Records. In the same year, he released a Christmas album, Christmas Away from Home, and dedicated it to his late uncle Reny. The album was re-released in 2008, where he donated the proceeds from the sales to GMA Kapuso Foundation. Also in 2008, he released a cover album, Soul in Love, which became his highest-rated and biggest-selling album. He made his big screen debut in the 2004 feature film Happy Together, and later, released his self-titled second album in 2005.

He released an all-Tagalog album early in 2010, Jay R Sings OPM Love Classics, which consists of revivals of Original Pilipino Music love songs. Later, he recorded a Bahasa song, which is slated for release in Indonesia. He is part of TV musical variety show Party Pilipinas on GMA, and hosts the Philippine adaptation of dating game show Take Me Out on the same network.

After more than 10 years of being with GMA Network, he transferred to the rival network, ABS-CBN in 2014. After more than three months, he joined the impersonating competition Your Face Sounds Familiar as his first reality show in the network.

Early life
Jay R was born on February 1, 1982, in Glendale, California, and raised in U.P. Campus and Daan Tubo. His father, Gaudencio Sillona Jr., is a pianist, and his mother, Amparo Aquino-Sillona, is a singer. He is a grandson of the late Gaudencio Sillona, Sr. He is the youngest of four siblings. On his father's side, he has five brothers, saying "Before my parents got together, my father was married to somebody else." As of 2004 he was managed by his aunt, choreographer Geleen Eugenio. He speaks fluent Tagalog. Among his musical influences as a young man were Stevie Wonder, Luther Vandross and Gary Valenciano.

Music career

1997–2002: Early works and debut
At the age of sixteen, Sillona already belonged to a group called FI (First Impression). The group consisted of five members namely—Mike Gabriel, Alex Bacani, Jay R Sillona, Jimmy Martinez (who came with him to Manila and is now Jimmy Muna) and Owen Amurao. When Mike, Owen and Alex went their separate ways, he and Martinez continued the group by adding another talented singer named Kris Cadevida (later known as Kris Lawrence). They would do gigs in Los Angeles, San Francisco, and Michigan. He was also the lead singer, with his sister Jhing, of another band that was led by his uncle, Robert Sillona, called The Howlers. Later, Jhing collaborated with him in creating hit songs.

Sillona later started performing gigs all around southern California. He also did back-up vocals for major artists, whose albums were released in the United States, Latin America, the Philippines, and other territories. Later, he started co-writing songs with international artists. He collaborated with Ray Brown, Troy Johnson, Jason Edmonds, 3AM, Steve Singer, Gary Brown, The Triangle, Dutch Cousin, Chuck Cymone and many other talented producers.

2003–2005: Gameface and self-titled album
In 2003, Sillona signed a contract under Universal Records label. His first album, entitled Gameface,  consists of twelve tracks, containing two original Tagalog songs—"Kaibigan", written by his sister Jhing Sillona, and "Bakit Pa Ba", written by Vehnee Saturno. Most of the other songs on the album are R&B cuts, and were co-written by him. Ten of the tracks were produced by respected American producers Troy Johnson, Ian Boxhill and Bryson Evans. His first single, "Design for Luv", is an R&B, hip-hop single, and had its music video filmed and produced in Hollywood with the help of good friend Ray Brown. Following the first single, he released a Tagalog ballad penned by Vehnee Saturno, entitled "Bakit Pa Ba". It became the biggest hit not only from the album, but also from the artist. In 2004, the album was re-released with two new songs that were later used as singles. The album was well-received both commercially and critically. It was certified Platinum by the Philippine Association of the Record Industry. It was also nominated in numerous categories of major music awards. On the 2004 MTV Pilipinas Music Awards, "Bakit Pa Ba" won Sillona the Favorite Male Artist award, also allowing him to grab the "Best Ballad" title on the Awit Awards of the same year. In April 2004, he accomplished his first ever three-night solo major concert which was entitled Gameface the Concert at the Music Museum, immediately followed by Gameface Reload in September 2004.

After the success of his debut album, Sillona focused on doing a more complex R&B sound. He covered the Billy Joel original "Just the Way You Are" in a whole different arrangement. In addition, he recorded an alternate version of the song, featuring Irish pop singer, Samantha Mumba. Alongside the single, his self-titled album was released. Among the album's collaborators are rappers Young Clipp, Jdimes, and Sillona's best friends, Jimmy Muna and Kris Lawrence. "Ngayo'y Narito", another ballad by Saturno, was released as the album's second official single. The album received positive reviews, with Titik Pilipino stating "I can't find a bad word for Jay R (the artist and the album) because he and his album are good". Despite high ratings, it failed to gather any award it was nominated for. Still, the album managed to reach gold status by the PARI. In 2005, he was part of Footloose: The Musical, together with Iya Villania. In the same year, he appeared on Karylle's album, You Make Me Sing, as a featured artist, songwriter and producer.

2006–2009: Homeworkz Records
In 2006, Sillona built  Homeworkz recording studio inside his two-story mansion. He started the label JAYRS Music. In an interview about his recording studio, he explained "It's a necessity for a recording artist [...] It saves a lot of money in the long run and it's very convenient. You can work on the recordings at any time of the day". The studio occupies a large room that was originally one of the bedrooms. Sillona himself was the one who conceptualized the look, which pictures a modern bachelor pad with dark carpeting and sofas, and a bar for small parties. Recording equipment he acquired in the U.S. include a personal computer, a black upright piano and a recording booth. In 2008, he renamed it as Homeworkz Entertainment Services.  Homeworkz for short.
 
In November 2006, he released his first ever Christmas album, Christmas Away from Home. The album consists of classic Christmas songs and two originals, one featuring his sister Jhing entitled "Spread the Love". It, also, was inspired by and dedicated to his late uncle Reny. He stated, "The entire album is actually inspired by him [...] His death triggered something in me, and I knew that a tribute was the best way to thank him and cherish his legacy". Produced by JAYRS Music, it marks his initial attempt at running his own independent record label. He single-handedly produced, arranged, mixed, mastered and attended to all details. The album was re-released in 2008 as Holiday of Love, including six additional Christmas songs, replacing the three instrumentals. Album sales and proceeds were entirely donated to GMA-7's Kapuso Foundation. He stresses the album's title, saying "It's Christmas after all [...] it's only fitting that I practice what I preach. It's all about giving". In 2007, he was featured on Amber's song, "FYI".

Early in 2008, Sillona released another studio album, Soul in Love. It was his second cover album, containing classical R&Bs and jazzes that he grew up listening to. The album has received the highest ratings among Jay R albums, and has even sold impressively, certifying gold in the Philippines without any initial promotion. It has also helped him gain new audience and group of fans. Titik Pilipino gave the album a perfect rating of five out of five stars, saying "As everybody should be well aware of by now, Jay R is a very talented artist". It has also earned Sillona numerous awards and nominations on awarding events. On the 2008 Philippine Hip-Hop Awards, he won the R&B Artist of the Year award for the first time. It also gave him a Best Male Soul/R&B Artist nomination on the first ever Wave 89.1 Urban Music Awards in 2009. On July 10, 2008, he went to Japan to further increase in sales and popularity. Later, the album turned Platinum in the Philippines. From 2008 to 2009, he appeared on Iya Villania, Kris Aquino, Kris Lawrence, Billy Crawford albums.

Jay R also played a lead role on Dear Friend'''s episode, "The Three Bachelors", starring opposite longtime music partner Kyla.

2010–2012: Jay R Sings OPM Love Classics and International exposure
On January 5, 2010, Sillona released his first ever all-Tagalog album, Jay R Sings OPM Love Classics, still by Universal Records. It consists of thirteen Tagalog songs, which were originally recorded by popular OPM acts in the 1980s and 1990s, handpicked by the singer himself. He personally love the songs that he chose, but admitted the challenges of remaking the materials, having said that they already have identities marked in them. On a song in the album, entitled "Muli", he collaborated with "Asia's Soul Siren" Nina. The album was critically successful. Inquirer Entertainment praised Sillona's outstanding vocal performance, stating "The singer (Jay R) is gifted with a voice suited for classy, urban R&B and he practically breezes through most of the ballads". In summer 2010, he participated on another compilation by Kris Aquino, Blessings of Love, singing a cover version of "Dance with My Father".

On September 2, 2010, Sillona went to Jakarta, Indonesia, to sign a three-year contract with Tarra Group Indonesia, and to record an original song in Bahasa. It also included the launching of his album Soul in Love in the country. He did some TV guestings, and also finished shooting a music video, slated for release in the country. He collaborated with Indonesian pop singer Drimi on the song "Kau Dan Aku", which will be released as his first Bahasa single. He also co-wrote and co-produced the song "Beauty Queen" for his girlfriend Krista Arrieta Kleiner (Miss Philippines), which received an award for Miss Expressive, after she performed the song live at the Miss International 2010 held in China.

2014: Elevated album
Jay released his Elevated album in 2014.  This was a statement album because it was launched under his own label Homeworkz.  Tonight featuring Mica Javier was an instant smash and rose to the top of the radio charts at No. 1.  The song was also received best R&B song of the year from Wave 89.1 FM and 93.1 Monster FM.  All the singles from the album also have music videos available on the Homeworkzmusic YouTube Channel. Singles from Elevated album : Falling For You featuring Marié Digby, Tonight featuring Mica Javier, Parachute, You're The One featuring Kris Lawrence & AJ Rafael, You Are Not Alone featuring Kyla, Follow Me featuring DJ Riddler, Already Mine.  The song L-O-V-E written and produced by Jay R's good friend Marcus Davis was part of Hollywood movie Bounce Back.  Starring Shemar Moore, Nadine Velasquez, Bill Bellamy and more.  The album was a sweet victory for label owner Jay R because it reached Gold status and was awarded by PARI (Philippine Association of the Recording Industry) on ABS-CBN TV show ASAP channel 2.

In 2016, Jay R was announced to be a member of the R&B group of ASAP titled ASAP Soul Sessions, along with Jason Dy, Daryl Ong, KZ Tandingan and Kyla. The group formed on May 15, 2016, and disbanded in late 2017.

2018–present: Kamusta Ka album
Jay R has always been the innovative type.  That is why in 2018 he launched a new music technology that the Philippines have never seen before.  He dubbed it the "Artist Digi Pack".  The Artist Digi Pack comes with the Kamusta Ka album of 9 songs, 4 videos, picture gallery of album photoshoot, earphones, 2gb MP3 player and a to charge and access the exclusive files.  He is now currently promoting the singles on TV shows, radio, podcasts and live shows.  in late 2017 Homeworkz launched a teaser single entitled Kabilang Dako written by Thyro and Jay R.  It was an instant hit and won R&B song of the year on Wave 89.1 FM and Wish FM Awards.  When 2018 struck he then started to release music videos for songs Kamusta Ka and Kabilang Dako which was shot in beautiful New Zealand.  Jay R then released a song with his Soul Brothers Kris Lawrence and Billy Crawford called Habang Buhay.  Within the music video he surprised his girlfriend of 5 years Mica Javier by proposing to her while shooting.  She was happily surprised and said yes.

In 2018, Jay R performed "Dito Lang Ako", which was written and composed by Jack Rufo, and produced by Blade Entertainment for the movie "Dito Lang Ako". The song becomes the love theme for the 2019 romantic comedy film 12 Days to Destiny.

In 2018, Jay R signed up with Cornerstone Entertainment. Afterwards, he would stage a collaborative concert titled SoulJa with Jaya and Jason Dy in August of the said year.

Acting career
In 2004, Sillona appeared in a recurring role on GMA-7's drama series Narito Ang Puso Ko. It was immediately followed with a main role on an episode of Love to Love entitled "Duet for Love", where he was teamed up with Toni Gonzaga. He played the role of Marvin, an Amboy who went on vacation to a beach resort and met a girl named Tammy, on which he shares the same things in common like singing. In December 2004, he made his film debut on Regal Films' entry for the year's Metro Manila Film Festival, So Happy Together. He portrayed the minor role of Brent, a young man who later became Kris Aquino's love interest in the movie. In summer 2005, he was cast on another episode of Love to Love, entitled "Haunted Lovehouse". He played Bogart, a guy who inherited his grandfather's land. Unfortunately, Nadia (Chynna Ortaleza) built a house on his land, forcing them to share the house together. He later starred on a feature film, Hari ng Sablay, which was released on November 30, 2005. Before the year ended, he played the antagonist role of Haring Bagulbol on Exodus: Tales from the Enchanted Kingdom. The film was Regal's entry for 2005 Metro Manila Film Festival. It was critically acclaimed, earning ten awards and numerous nominations. In addition, the film was praised due to its impressive use of visual effects.

In 2006, Sillona played a recurring role on Encantadia: Pag-ibig Hanggang Wakas. He portrayed Azulan, a strong and gorgeous leader of the Bahaghari, who fancies Sangg're Amihan (Iza Calzado). On January 1, 2008, he starred on another Metro Manila Film Festival entry entitled Desperadas. He played the sexy role of Vito, an underwear model who works for Courtney (Marian Rivera), and likes Isabella (Ruffa Gutierrez), but cannot get her to commit. In October of the same year, he portrayed Pato, a recurring role in the Filipino adaptation of LaLola. Before 2008 ended, Desperadas was immediately followed by its sequel, rushed as Regal's entry on the 2008 Metro Manila Film Festival. Sillona reprised his role, Vito, for the film, where it was reported that Gutierrez did not approve on having a kissing scene with him. In 2009, he played Vince, a lead role on Dear Friend's episode, "The Three Bachelors"  starring opposite longtime music partner Kyla.

Other ventures
Sillona has admitted himself as a business-minded person, saying that unlike show business, he wanted something stable and something that's working already. In 2007, he built a recording studio in his house called JAYRS Music, which was later renamed as Homeworkz Studio. With a studio, he had to follow it with a recording label, and so he did. It was named as Homeworkz Records. Under the label, he self-handedly writes and produces songs, and has recorded three of his albums—Christmas Away from Home, Soul in Love and Jay R Sings OPM Love Classics. In 2008, the song "Kayan Natin Ito", a tribute for the victims of the 2009 Typhoon Ondoy, was recorded in his Homeworkz Studio, together with various OPM artists. Under Homeworkz Records, he is managing an alternative band called Kley, wherein the lead singer is his very talented and beautiful niece DeeJay.

In February 2007, Sillona launched a club at Glorietta, called Rock Candy. However, it blasted as it was part of the 2007 Glorietta Explosion in October 2007. He lost millions of his investments, stating "I never recovered my capital as it happened at a time when the club was already picking up". After the disaster, he decided to just focus and invest on a Ministop outlet that he bought at Wilson Street in Greenhills Shopping Center, instead of reconstructing his club. He stated in an interview that Katya Santos was the one who recommended him to go into this kind of business. He also had ideas of owning a Burger Machine branch, but as he inquired, he knew that the business has no franchise. He expressed interest in having a branch of Mang Inasal, but has not pursued it yet, since it requires ₱7 million for the area, and twenty-eight persons for manpower. He also stated that he wants to have his own water station, and not a franchise.

Sillona has done commercials and theme songs for products like Sun Cellular, Tropicana, and Colgate."Shaina, Jay-R – two of today’s sought-after product endorsers". Manila Bulletin Retrieved September 3, 2010 He is also a commercial model for Bench Body, Techno Marine, Unisilver, Adidas, Skechers and Calayan Surgicenter.Rommel Gonzales (June 21, 2007) "Jay-R enjoys bachelorhood but remains loyal to his girlfriend", Philippine Entertainment Portal"Jay R endorses for Dr. Manny Calayan". Philippine Entertainment Portal

Philanthropy
In 2008, Sillona re-released his 2006 Christmas album, Christmas Away from Home into Holiday of Love, under his own label called Homeworkz Records. Sales of the album were donated to GMA-7's Kapuso Foundation. In 2009, he was part of the recording for the song, "Kaya Natin Ito", a tribute to the victims of the Typhoon Ondoy. The song was recorded in his Homeworkz studio. All proceeds from the single's sales went towards Philippine Red Cross and Gawad Kalinga. On June 30, 2010, he performed with Kyla, Nina and Jed Madela on the victory street party of Philippine President Benigno Aquino III, after the president's inauguration.

Personal life
On March 1, 2020, Jay R married singer-actress Mica Javier in an outdoor ceremony at the Lind in Boracay, Malay, Aklan.

Discography

 Gameface (2003)
 Jay R (2005)
 Christmas Away from Home (2006)
 Soul in Love (2008)
 Jay R Sings OPM Love Classics (2010)
 Elevated (2014)
 Kamusta Ka'' (2018)
 “Pangako with CLR” (2020)
 “Seryoso” (2020)
 “Undeniable with Kyla” (2020)

Filmography

Film

Television

Awards and nominations

See also
 ALV Talent Circuit
 Party Pilipinas
 Kyla

Notes

References

External links
 Official website
 
 

1981 births
Living people
American expatriates in the Philippines
American musicians of Filipino descent
Filipino male television actors
Filipino male pop singers
Filipino contemporary R&B singers
21st-century Filipino male singers
Filipino songwriters
Filipino singer-songwriters
Filipino male voice actors
Filipino male models
GMA Network personalities
Male actors from Glendale, California
Writers from Glendale, California
ABS-CBN personalities
American contemporary R&B singers
American soul singers
20th-century American male singers
20th-century American singers
20th-century Filipino male singers
21st-century American male actors
21st-century American male singers
21st-century American singers
21st-century Filipino male actors
Filipino male film actors